The United National Democratic Party was a political party in Antigua and Barbuda. It contested the 1989 general elections, winning 31% of the vote but only one seat. In 1992 it was one of three opposition parties to merge into the United Progressive Party.

References

Defunct political parties in Antigua and Barbuda
Political parties with year of establishment missing
Political parties disestablished in 1992
1992 disestablishments in Antigua and Barbuda